Wyatt Earp's fame and reputation has varied through the years.  While alive, he had many admirers and detractors. Among his peers near the time of his death, Wyatt Earp was respected. His deputy Jimmy Cairns described Earp's work as a police officer in Wichita, Kansas. "Wyatt Earp was a wonderful officer. He was game to the last ditch and apparently afraid of nothing. The cowmen all respected him and seemed to recognize his superiority and authority at such times as he had to use it." He described Wyatt as "...the most dependable man I ever knew; a quiet, unassuming chap who never drank and in all respects a clean young fellow..."

Among the general public, Earp was likely more well known for the controversy that engulfed him after the Fitzsimmons vs. Sharkey  match in San Francisco than for the gunfight in Tombstone. His Associated Press obituary gave prominent attention to his officiating of the boxing match, while describing him as a "gun-fighter whose blazing six-shooters were, for most of his life, allied with the side of law and order". Earp was often the target of negative newspaper stories that disparaged his and his brothers' reputations. Public perception of his life has varied as media accounts of his life have evolved.

Contemporary reputation
When citizens of Dodge City learned the Earps had been charged with murder after the gunfight, they sent letters endorsing and supporting the Earps to Judge Wells Spicer.

John Clum, owner of The Tombstone Epitaph and mayor of Tombstone while Earp was a gambler and lawman there, described him in his book It All Happened in Tombstone.

Bill Dixon knew Wyatt early in his adult life. He wrote:

Public perception of his life has varied over the years as media accounts of his life changed. The story of the Earps' actions in Tombstone were published at the time by newspapers nationwide. Shortly after the shooting of Curly Bill, the Tucson Star wrote on March 21, 1882, in an editorial about the O.K. Corral gunfight, that the Cowboys had been ordered to put their hands up and after they complied, were shot by the Earps, stating, "The whole series of killings cannot be classed other than cold blooded murder."

Famous lawman Bat Masterson described Wyatt in 1907.

Experience in gun fights
Wyatt was reputed to be an expert with a revolver. He showed no fear of any man. The Tombstone Epitaph said of Wyatt, "Bravery and determination were requisites, and in every instance proved himself the right man in the right place."

Wyatt was lucky during the few gun fights he took part in from his earliest job as an assistant police officer in Wichita to Tombstone, where he was briefly deputy U.S. marshal. Unlike his lawmen brothers Virgil and James, Wyatt was never wounded, although once his clothing and his saddle were shot through with bullet holes. According to John H. Flood's biography (as dictated to him by Wyatt Earp), Wyatt vividly recalled a presence that in several instances warned him away or urged him to take action. This happened when he was on the street, alone in his room at the Cosmopolitan Hotel, at Bob Hatch's Pool Hall, where he went moments before Morgan was assassinated, and again when he approached Iron Springs and surprised Curly Bill Brocius, killing him.

Later reputation
After the shootout in Tombstone, his pursuit and murder of those who attacked his brothers, and after leaving Arizona, Wyatt was often the target of negative newspaper stories that disparaged his and his brothers' reputation. His role in history has stimulated considerable ongoing scholarly and editorial debate. A large body of literature has been written about Wyatt Earp and his legacy, some of it highly fictionalized. Considerable portions of it are either full of admiration and flattery or hostile debunking.

Wyatt was repeatedly criticized in the media over the remainder of his life. His wife Josephine wrote, "The falsehoods that were printed in some of the newspapers about him and the unjust accusations against him hurt Wyatt more deeply than anything that ever happened to him during my life with him, with the exception of his mother's death and that of his father and brother, Warren."

Negative publicity
On April 16, 1894, the Fort Worth Gazette wrote that Virgil Earp and John Behan had a "deadly feud". It described Behan as "an honest man, a good official, and possessed many of the attributes of a gentleman". Earp, on the other hand, "was head of band of desperadoes, a partner in stage robbers, and a friend of gamblers and professional killers... Wyatt was the boss killer of the region."

Former nemesis Johnny Behan continued to spread rumors about the Earps for the next twenty years. On December 7, 1897, he was quoted in a story in the Washington Post, reprinted by the San Francisco Call, describing the Earp's lawbreaking behavior in Tombstone. After referring to the Fitzimmons-Sharkey fight, the article quoted Behan. "The Clanton brothers and the McLowrys were a tough lot of rustlers who were the main perpetrators of the rascailly rife in that region. Between them and Earps rose a bitter feud over the division of the proceeds of the looting. The Earp boys believed they had failed to get a fair divide of the booty and swore vengeance. They caught their former allies in Tombstone unarmed and shot three of them dead while their hands were uplifted." Behan went on to say, "They were hauled up before a Justice of the Peace... Warrants were issued for their arrest, and, summoning a posse, I went out to bring the Earps in. They were chased entirely out of the country and Tombstone knew them no more." Up until he died in 1912, Johnny Behan lambasted the Earps as the bad men who had attacked the cowboys.

After Earp left Alaska in 1901, the New York Sun printed a story in 1903 that described a confrontation Earp had reportedly had with a short  Cockney Canadian Mountie, who embarrassed Earp by demanding that he leave his weapon in his room. The story was reprinted as far away as New Zealand by the Otago Witness. The Dawson Record commented on the story, mocking the newspaper as a "venerable dispenser of truth".

On April 13, 1921, the Arizona Republican ran a lengthy interview with Thomas Raines, a former resident of Tombstone. Raines described the gunfight as an ambush. He said that he remembered the Earps shot the Cowboys and killed Ike Clanton (when they actually killed his brother Billy) before the Cowboys had a chance to surrender. He recalled that the Cowboys "were leading their horses out of the gate when they were confronted, almost from ambush, by four of the Earps, Virgil. Wyatt, Morgan and Jim and by Doc Holliday. Virgil Earp, armed with a sawed off express shotgun, and accompanying his demand with profanity, yelled "Hands up!" But he didn't wait for the action demanded and shot almost as soon as he spoke. Tom McLowery showed his empty bands, and cried. 'Gentlemen, I am unarmed.' Holliday answered with the discharge of his shotgun. Ike Clanton fell at the first fire, mortally wounded, but he rolled over and fired two shots from his pistol between his bent knees."

During 1922 Frederick R. Bechdolt published the book When the West Was Young, which included a story about Wyatt's time in Tombstone, but he mangled many basic facts. He described the Earp-Clanton differences as the falling-out of partners in crime.

On March 12, 1922, the Sunday Los Angeles Times ran a short, scandalous article titled "Lurid Trails Are Left by Olden-Day Bandits" by J.M. Scanland. It described Wyatt and his brothers as a gang, comparable to the Dalton Gang, who waylaid the cowboys in the shoot out at the O.K. Corral. It said that the Earps were allies of Frank Stilwell, who had informed on them, so they killed him, and that Earp had died in Colton, California.

The author concocted a fictional description of the Earp's relationship with Sheriff Behan and the Cowboys:

Josephine and Earps' friend and actor William Hart both wrote letters to the publisher. Josephine demanded that the error "must be corrected and printed in the same sensational manner" given to the correction as to the original article, which the paper published.

Reputation at death
At the time of his death, Earp may have been more well known for the controversy that engulfed him after the Fitzsimmons vs. Sharkey match in San Francisco than for the gunfight in Tombstone. His Associated Press obituary gave prominent attention to his officiating of the Fitzsimmons-Sharkey fight, while describing him as a "gun-fighter whose blazing six-shooters were, for most of his life, allied with the side of law and order".

In its January 14, 1929, obituary, the Los Angeles Times wrote a fictional account of Earp's taming Colton, California:

Modern reputation
Long after his death, he has many devoted detractors and admirers. Earp's modern-day reputation is that of the Old West's "toughest and deadliest gunman of his day".

Walter Noble Burns
Author Walter Noble Burns visited Earp in September 1926 and asked him questions with the intent to write a book about Earp. Earp declined because he was already collaborating with John Flood. Burns visited Tombstone and based on what he learned decided instead to focus his book on Doc Holliday. He pestered Earp for facts, and on March 27 the next year, Earp finally responded to Burns' repeated requests in an 11-page letter outlining the basic facts from Earp's point of view.

When their efforts to get the Flood manuscript published failed, the Earps decided to appeal to Burns, whose own book was near publication. But he was not interested. His book was about to be published, free of the constraints imposed by a collaboration with Earp. Burns wrote them, "I should not now care to undertake another book which, in part at least, would be upon much the same lines... I should have been delighted six months ago to accept your offer but it is too late now. My book has championed Mr. Earp's cause throughout and I believe will vindicate his reputation in Tombstone in a way that he will like." When Burns turned them down, Josephine actively worked to stop the publication of his book, fearful that their efforts to publish Wyatt's biography would be thwarted as a result.

In late 1927 Burns published Tombstone, An Iliad of the Southwest, a mesmerizing tale "of blood and thunder" that christened Earp as the "Lion of Tombstone". "Strong, bold, forceful, picturesque was the fighter of the old frontier. Something epic in him, fashioned in Homeric mold. In his way, a hero." It included a good deal about Wyatt, to Wyatt and Josie's displeasure. Readers and reviewers had difficulty discerning between "fact and fiction". The book is the first to have popularized its subject for a mass reading audience. Burns treated Earp as a mythical figure, a "larger-than-life hero whose many portrayals in film, television, and books often render fidelity to truth the first casualty".

Billy Breakenridge
While living in Vidal, Wyatt and Josie were visited by Billy Breakenridge, the former Tombstone deputy under John Behan. He pressed Wyatt for details about his time in Tombstone to add to his book Helldorado: Bringing Law to the Mesquite. Breakenridge was assisted by Western novelist William MacLeod Raine, who since 1904 had published more than 25 novels about Western history. The book was published in 1928 before Wyatt died. It depicted Wyatt as a thief, pimp, crooked gambler, and murderer. Breakenridge wrote that the Earps and Doc Holliday aggressively mistreated the guiltless Cowboys until they were forced into a fatal confrontation. His description of the 1881 O.K. Corral gun fight stated that the Clanton and McLaury brothers were merely Cowboys who had been unarmed and surrendered but the Earp brothers had shot them in cold blood. Wyatt and Josie protested that the book's contents were biased and more fiction than fact. Earp complained about the book until his death in 1929, and his wife continued in the same vein afterward.

Edwin Burkholder
Edwin V. Burkholder, who specialized in stories about the Old West, published an article about Wyatt in 1955 in Argosy Magazine. He called Wyatt Earp a coward and murderer, and manufactured evidence to support his allegations. He also wrote, using the pseudonyms "George Carleton Mays" and "J. S. Qualey", for the Western magazine Real West. His stores were filled with sensational claims about Wyatt Earp's villainy, and he made up fake letters to the editor from supposed "old-timers" to corroborate this story.

Frank Waters
Frank Waters interviewed Virgil Earp's widow, Allie Sullivan Earp, to write The Earp Brothers of Tombstone. Allie Earp was so upset by the way Waters distorted and manipulated her words that she threatened to shoot him. His writing was so contentious and disputed that he waited until 13 years after her death to publish the book. In it, Waters vociferously berated Wyatt:

Purportedly quoting Allie, he invented bitter public fights between Mattie and Wyatt, and told how Wyatt's affair with Sadie Marcus, "the slut of Tombstone", had humiliated Mattie. He condemned the Earp brothers' character and called them names.

Waters used Allie Earp's anecdotes as a frame for adding a narrative and "building a case, essentially piling quote upon quote to prove that Wyatt Earp was a con man, thief, robber, and eventually murderer". The book "further embroidered upon Frank Waters's imaginings about Wyatt's adulterous affair" with Josephine. It was described by one reviewer as "a smear campaign levied against the Earp brothers". Years later, he wrote a letter to the Arizona Historical Society in which he admitted that he had combined Allie's words to create a "cold, objective analysis" and "expose" of the whole subject.

S. J. Reidhead, author of Travesty: Frank Waters Earp Agenda Exposed, spent nearly a decade searching for Water's original manuscript, researching him, his background, and his bias against the Earps. In doing so the author discovered that the story Waters presented against the Earps was primarily fictitious. "Nothing is documented," she wrote. "There are no notes nor sourcing. There is only the original Tombstone Travesty manuscript and the final Earp Brothers of Tombstone. Because of his later reputation, few writers, even today, dare question Waters's motives. They also do not bother fact checking the Earp Brothers of Tombstone, which is so inaccurate it should be considered fiction, rather than fact."

Writers and researchers opposing Earp use Frank Waters's Earp Brothers of Tombstone as their primary source for material that presents Wyatt Earp as something of a villainous monster, aided and abetted by his brothers who were almost brutes. Waters detested the Earps so badly that he presented a book that was terribly flawed, poorly edited, and brimming with prevarications. In his other work Waters is poetic. In the Earp Brothers of Tombstone he is little more than a tabloid hack, trying to slander someone he dislikes. To date, no reason has been uncovered for the bias Frank Waters exhibited against Wyatt Earp and his brothers.

Ed Bartholomew
In 1963 Ed Bartholomew published Wyatt Earp, The Untold Story followed by Wyatt Earp: Man and Myth in 1964. His books were strongly anti-Earp and attacked Wyatt Earp's image as a hero. Bartholomew went about this by reciting snippets of accumulated anti-Earp facts, rumors, gossip, and innuendo. Bartholomew's books started a trend of debunking Earp, and the academic community followed his lead, pursuing the image of Earp as a "fighting pimp".

Allen Barra
In reviewing Allen Barra's Inventing Wyatt Earp. His Life and Many Legends, William Urban, a professor of history at Monmouth College in Warren County, Illinois, pointed out a number of factual inaccuracies in the book. One inconsistency by Barra, pointed out by another reviewer, includes a description of the poker game the night before the shootout. Ike Clanton's account of the game (the only one that exists) gives the participants as John Behan, Virgil Earp, Ike Clanton, Tom McLaury, and a fifth man Ike did not recognize, while Barra wrote that Holliday had attended the game.

Fame
Earp was dismayed about the controversy that continually followed him.

He wrote a letter to John Hays Hammond on May 21, 1925, telling him "notoriety had been the bane of my life. I detest it, and I never have put forth any effort to check the tales that have been published in which my brothers and I are supposed to have been the principal participants. Not one of them is correct."

The 1922 scandalous story in the Sunday Los Angeles Times by Scanland annoyed Earp. He was tired of all the lies perpetuated about him and became determined to get his story accurately told. Still, in 1924, a story in a San Francisco paper said that interviewing him was "like pulling teeth". Earp did not trust the press and preferred to keep his mouth shut.

The many negative, untruthful stories bothered Earp a great deal, and he finally decided to tell his own story. Earp also tried to find J. M. Scanland, the author of the LA Times article, and extract a written retraction from him, which he finally did in 1927.

In 1925 Earp began to collaborate on a biography with his friend and former mining engineer John Flood to get his story told in a way that he approved.

Lake's biography

Unlike most legendary lawmen of the American West, Earp was relatively unknown until Stuart N. Lake published the first biography of Wyatt Earp, Wyatt Earp: Frontier Marshal in 1931, two years after Earp died. Lake portrayed Earp as a "Western superhero" who single-handedly cleaned up a town full of Cowboy criminals. In fact, Earp had been a stagecoach guard for Wells Fargo, a full-time gambler, a regular associate of prostitutes, and, occasionally, a lawman.

Lake wrote the book with Earp's input, but was only able to interview him eight times before Earp died, during which Earp sketched out the "barest facts" of his life. With very little information from Earp, Lake wrote the biography in the first person.

Lake initially sought Earp out hoping to write a magazine article about him. Earp was also seeking a biographer at about the same time. Aged 80 years, Earp was concerned that his vantage point on the Tombstone story may be lost, and may have been financially motivated, as he had little income in his last years.

During the interviews and in later correspondence, Josephine and Wyatt went to great lengths to keep her name out of Lake's book. Lake wrote Earp that he planned to send portions of the book to his New York agent, but Earp objected because he wanted to read it first. After Earp's death on January 13, 1929, Josephine continued to try to persuade Lake to leave her and Earp's former wife, Mattie Blaylock, out of the book, even threatening legal action. Lake finally published Wyatt Earp: Frontier Marshal in 1931, two years after Earp's death.

Lake's creative biography portrays Earp as a "Western superhero", "gallant white knight", and entirely avoided mentioning Josephine Earp or Blaylock. A number of Hollywood movies have been directly and indirectly influenced by Lake's book and its depiction of Earp's role as a western lawman. The book drew considerable positive attention and established Lake as a western screenwriter for years to come. It also established the gunfight at the O.K. Corral in the public consciousness and Earp as a fearless lawman in the American Old West.

The book "is now regarded more as fiction than fact", and "an imaginative hoax, a fabrication mixed with just enough fact to give it credibility".

Reputation as a teetotaler
Josephine Earp worked hard to create an image of Wyatt as a teetotaler, but as a saloon owner and gambler, he drank occasionally. When Flood and Lake wrote their biographies, Prohibition was in force. Among the facts Josephine wanted scrubbed from Earp's history, was that he liked a drink. She persuaded biographers Flood, Lake, and Burns to write that Earp was a non-drinker. A good friend of Earp's, Charlie Welsh, was known to disappear for days at a time "to see property", the family euphemism for a drinking binge, and Earp was his regular partner. Director John Ford said that whenever Josephine left town for religious conventions, Earp would come into town, play poker, and get drunk with the cowboy actors.

Colt Buntline Special

Lake wrote about the Colt Buntline Special, a variant of the long-barreled Colt Single Action Army revolver. According to Lake's biography, dime novelist Ned Buntline had five Buntline Specials commissioned. Lake described them as extra-long Colt Single Action Army revolvers with  barrels. Buntline was supposed to have presented them to lawmen in thanks for their help with contributing "local color" to his western yarns. According to Lake, the revolver was equipped with a detachable metal shoulder stock. Lake wrote that Earp and four other well-known western lawmenBat Masterson, Bill Tilghman, Charlie Bassett and Neal Browneach received a Buntline Special. However, neither Tilghman nor Brown were lawmen then.

Researchers have never found any record of such an order received by the Colt company, and Ned Buntline's alleged connections to Earp's have been largely discredited.

After the publication of Lake's book, various Colt revolvers with long (10" or 16") barrels were referred to as "Colt Buntlines". Colt re-introduced the revolvers in its second generation revolvers produced after 1956. The Buntline Special was further popularized by The Life and Legend of Wyatt Earp television series.

Dubious claims by Earp
Earp's reputation has been confused by inaccurate, conflicting, and false stories told about him by others, and by his own claims that cannot be corroborated. For example, in an interview with a reporter in Denver in 1896, he denied that he had killed Johnny Ringo. He then flipped his story, claiming he had killed Ringo. In 1888, he was interviewed by an agent of California historian Hubert H. Bancroft, and Earp claimed that he had killed "over a dozen stage robbers, murderers, and cattle thieves". In about 1918 he told Forrestine Hooker, who wrote an unpublished manuscript, and then Frank Lockwood, who wrote Pioneer Days in Arizona in 1932, that he was the one who killed Johnny Ringo as Ringo left Arizona in March 1882, almost four months before Ringo was found dead with a bullet wound to the temple. Earp also included details that do not match what is known about Ringo's death. Earp repeated that claim to at least three other people.

At the hearing following the Tombstone shootout, Earp said he had been marshal in Dodge City, a claim he repeated in an August 16, 1896, interview that appeared in The San Francisco Examiner. But Earp had only been an assistant city marshal there.

During an interview with his future biographer Stuart Lake during the late 1920s, Earp said that he arrested notorious gunslinger Ben Thompson in Ellsworth, Kansas, on August 15, 1873, when news accounts and Thompson's own contemporary account about the episode do not mention his presence. He also told Lake that he had hunted buffalo during 1871 and 1872, but Earp was arrested three times in the Peoria area during that period for "keeping and being found in a house of ill-fame". He was arrested and jailed on a horse theft charge on April 6, 1871. However he was not convicted of the last charge and was released.

In the same interview Earp claimed that George Hoyt had intended to kill him, although newspaper accounts from that time report differently. He also said he and Bat Masterson had confronted Clay Allison when he was sent to Dodge City to finish George Hoyt's job, and that they had forced him to back down. Two other accounts contradicted Earp, crediting cattleman Dick McNulty and Long Branch Saloon owner Chalk Beeson with convincing Allison and his Cowboys to surrender their guns. Cowboy Charlie Siringo witnessed the incident and left a written account.

Modern image

Role in O.K. Corral gunfight
Wyatt outlived his brothers, and due to the fame Wyatt gained from Lake's biography and later adaptations of it, he is often mistakenly viewed as the central character and hero of the gunfight at the O.K. Corral. In fact, Virgil Earp, as Deputy U.S. Marshal and Tombstone City Marshal, actually held the legal authority in Tombstone the day of the shootout. Virgil had considerably more experience with weapons and combat as a Union soldier in the Civil War, and in law enforcement as a sheriff, constable, and marshal than did Wyatt. As city marshal, Virgil made the decision to enforce a city ordinance prohibiting carrying weapons in town and to disarm the Cowboys. Wyatt was only a temporary assistant marshal to his brother.

Cultural image as Western lawman
Earp's modern-day reputation is that of the Old West's "toughest and deadliest gunman of his day". He is "a cultural icon, a man of law and order, a mythic figure of a West where social control and order were notably absent". Due to Lake's fanciful biography and because Wyatt outlived all of his brothers, his name became famous and he is the primary figure in many movies, TV shows, biographies and works of fiction.

Western historian and author John Boessenecker describes Earp:

Josephine Earp memoir

One of the most well known, and for many years respected, books about Wyatt Earp was the book I Married Wyatt Earp, originally credited as a factual memoir by Josephine Marcus Earp. Published in 1976, it was edited by amateur historian Glenn Boyer, and published by the respected University of Arizona Press. It was immensely popular for many years, capturing the imagination of people with an interest in western history, studied in classrooms, cited by scholars, and relied upon as factual by filmmakers.

In 1998 writer Tony Ortega wrote a lengthy investigative article for the Phoenix New Times for which he interviewed Boyer. Boyer said that he was uninterested in what others thought of the accuracy of what he had written. "This is an artistic effort. I don't have to adhere to the kind of jacket that these people are putting on me. I am not a historian. I'm a storyteller."Boyer admitted that the book is "100 percent Boyer". He said the book was not really a first-person account, that he had interpreted Wyatt Earp in Josephine's voice, and admitted that he could not produce any documents to vindicate his methods.

The credibility of Boyer and the University Press was severely damaged. In 2000 the university referred all questions to its lawyers who investigated some of the allegations about Boyer's work. Later that year, the Press removed the book from its catalog. The book has been discredited as a fraud and a hoax that cannot be relied on.

As a result, other works by Boyer were subsequently questioned. His book, Wyatt Earp's Tombstone Vendetta, published in 1993, was according to Boyer based on an account written by a previously unknown Tombstone journalist that he named "Theodore Ten Eyck", but whose identity could not be independently verified. Boyer claimed that the manuscript was "clearly authentic" and that it contained "fascinating revelations (if they are true) and would make an ace movie". Boyer later said the character was in fact a blend of "scores of accounts", but could not provide any sources.

History professor William Urban also described "the questionable scholarship of Glenn Boyer, the dominant figure in Earpiana for the past several decades, who has apparently invented a manuscript and then cited it as a major source in his publications. This does not surprise this reviewer, who has personal experience with Boyer's pretentious exaggeration of his acquaintance with Warren County records."

References

External links
 

American folklore